The 2nd constituency of Haute-Vienne (French: Deuxième circonscription de la Haute-Vienne) is a French legislative constituency in the Haute-Vienne département. Like the other 576 French constituencies, it elects one MP using a two round electoral system.

Description

The 2nd Constituency of Haute-Vienne covers the south west portion of the Department and includes some of the city of Limoges. Historically the constituency leaned towards the centre-left. Daniel Boisserie of the Socialist Party represented the seat for twenty years between 1997 and 2007. His successor as PS candidate secured only 10.7% of the first round vote at the 2017 election coming fifth.

Assembly Members

Election results

2022

 
 
 
 
 
 
 
 
|-
| colspan="8" bgcolor="#E9E9E9"|
|-
 
 

 
 
 
 
 

* LREM dissident

2017

 
 
 
 
 
 
 
|-
| colspan="8" bgcolor="#E9E9E9"|
|-

2012

 
 
 
 
 
 
|-
| colspan="8" bgcolor="#E9E9E9"|
|-

2007

 
 
 
 
 
 
 
|-
| colspan="8" bgcolor="#E9E9E9"|
|-

2002

 
 
 
 
 
 
 
|-
| colspan="8" bgcolor="#E9E9E9"|
|-

1997

 
 
 
 
 
 
|-
| colspan="8" bgcolor="#E9E9E9"|
|-

References

2